Verulam is a town 24 kilometres north of Durban in KwaZulu-Natal, South Africa and part of the eThekwini Metropolitan area.

History
In 1850 a party of 400 Methodists settled here and formed the town. The town was then named after the Earl of Verulam, patron of the British who settled here.

Demography
Verulam is inhabited mainly by people of Indian descent. The population is over 63,000. There are several primary and secondary schools catering for all races and all areas of the town. The town contains densely populated residential and industrial areas, which include a multitude of shopping centres, mosques, temples & churches. At the outskirts are large farming areas, several built-up townships, and rural townships. There has been slow but steady progress in modernising the town by providing adequate infrastructure to the rural areas.

Geography 
Verulam is situated on the banks of the uMdloti River and on a gentle hilly terrain surrounded by sugarcane plantations to the north. Verulam forms part of the uMhlanga Coast/North Region of eThekwini which stretches from the uMngeni River in the south to the uThongathi River in the north and alongside Verulam includes Durban North, uMhlanga, Mount Edgecombe, oThongathi, eMdloti, La Mercy and Westbrook.

Verulam is situated approximately 24 km north-east of Durban and 10 km north-east of uMhlanga. It is bordered by Waterloo and Ottawa South to the south-east, Phoenix to the south, Mawothi to the south-west and Redcliffe to the west.

Suburbs 
Most of Verulam lies south of the uMdloti River except for the industrial suburbs of Canelands and Barrs Flats. The suburbs or neighbourhoods that form part of Verulam include: 

 Barrs Flats (industrial)
 Brindhaven (residential)
 Canelands (industrial)
 Cordoba Gardens (residential)
 Dawncrest (residential)
 Everest Heights (residential)
 Grangetown (residential)
 Litchie Farm (residential)
 Lotus Farm (residential)
 Lotusville (residential and industrial)
 Mountview (residential)
 Mzomuhle (residential)
 Oaklands (residential)
 Ottawa (residential)
 Redcliffe (residential)
 Riet River (residential)
 Riverview Park (residential and industrial)
 Riyadh (residential)
 Saana Township (residential)
 Southridge (residential)
 Temple Valley (residential)
 Umhloti Heights (residential and industrial)
 Valdin Heights (residential)

Religious places of interest
One of the main attractions in Verulam is the Sri Gopalall Hindu Temple which was opened in 1913 by Mahatma Gandhi. It is situated in the small suburb of Temple Valley in Verulam. It is one of the oldest temples in South Africa and still caters for prayer & wedding ceremonies. The Shree Siva Subramaniar Alayam has a significant following devotees with the annual Kavady procession being one of the highlights of the temple calendar. It is situated along the Umdloti River.

Another temple is the Gayathri Peedam, situated in Brindhaven. This is the only temple in Africa that houses two full figure Gayathri Murthi's. The ashram is very busy with Sacred Mantra Chants and Crystal Healing Crusades, weekly Navagraha's, Full Moon (Pournami) prayers and Friday Satsangs. The Peedam hosts a meditation garden; a Hanuman Shrine, Shiva Mandir, Sani Shrine and the only Mahavatar Kriya Babaj Shrine in Africa. The ashram focuses on community and youth development programs.

Christ Embassy Verulam is a church in Temple Valley run by Dr. Pastor Shane Maharaj and is a local branch of the main Christ Embassy Church in Nigeria headed by Pastor Chris Oyakhilome.

Blessed Life Ministries is a full gospel community church that is situated at the Redcliffe Primary School.

Muslim writer and motivational speaker Ahmed Deedat is buried in Verulam.

Nature
The Hazelmere Dam, just a few kilometres from Verulam, features a variety of activities, such as watersports, fishing, nature walks, bird watching, a wide range of game, campsites & luxury accommodation.

Verulam is situated just 8.5 km from the small community of Mount Moreland, an important roosting site for the European barn swallow.

Schools and Care Centre
Verulam has numerous schools, which include Lotusville Primary, Verulam Primary, Dawncrest Primary, Verulam Secondary, Mountview Secondary, Temple Valley Secondary, Verulam Independent School, Trenance Park Secondary, Everest Heights Primary School and Glenhaven Secondary School. Verulam Secondary School has had numerous learners placed among the top 10 matriculants in the province and nationally and has achieved a pass rate of +-97% for 6 consecutive years . Temple Valley Secondary has achieved a 95%+ pass rate for the past 5 years.

Verulam is also home to the Verulam Day and Frail Care Centre. The Frail Care Centre caters to destitute frail and elderly citizens with 24-hour nursing care. There is also a hall that is hired out for various functions and meetings.

Industry
Consumer products that are made in Verulam include Packo spices, Grafton Everest furniture, Colgate Palmolive and Frimax chips. Verulam market is a fresh produce market that draws daily customers from all over KwaZulu-Natal.

Transport

Air 
King Shaka International Airport is the only international airport in the Greater Durban metropolitan area and is the nearest airport to Verulam, located approximately 8 km north-east of the town via the R102 and M65. The international airport offers several flights to towns and cities domestically in South Africa as well as internationally to Doha, Dubai, Harare and Istanbul.

Rail 
The Verulam area is served by three railway stations including the main railway station, Verulam Station on the eastern border of the CBD, Canelands Station to the north and Ottawa Station to the south. 

Verulam is served by the commuter railway service of Metrorail and lies on its North Coast Line connecting Verulam to oThongathi, Groutville, Shakaskraal and KwaDukuza in the north-east, Mount Edgecombe in the south, Phoenix in the south-west and Durban, Amanzimtoti, Kingsburgh, Umkomaas and Scottburgh in the south-east.

Road 
Verulam's main road is the R102 which is the original N2 and served the same function before the construction of the highway. The R102 runs through the Central Business District (CBD) of Verulam and links the town to King Shaka International Airport and oThongathi in the north-east and Mount Edgecombe and Durban in the south-east. R102 can be used an alternative route to uMhlanga, Durban, Ballito (via M4 near Compensation) and KwaDukuza for motorists avoiding the tolled N2 highway.

Verulam also has access to other arterial routes such as the N2 highway and M27.

The N2 North Coast Toll Route is a national highway that bypasses Verulam to the east and links the town to KwaDukuza in the north-east and Durban in the south-west. Access to the N2 from Verulam can be obtained through the M27 Jabu Ngcobo Drive interchange (Exit 190).

The M27 links Verulam from its CBD to the N2 highway, the M4 highway and eMdloti in the east as Jabu Ngcobo Drive and Amaotana, Buffelsdraai and Inanda (via M25) as Old Inanda Road. Along with the R102, the M4 highway from its interchange with the M27 near eMdloti can also be used an alternative route to uMhlanga, Durban and Ballito for motorists avoiding the tolled N2 highway.

References

Populated places in eThekwini Metropolitan Municipality
Former Indian townships in South Africa
Townships in KwaZulu-Natal
Populated places established in 1850